Alhaji Gibril Sesay (August 1909 – September 2, 1988) was a Sierra Leonean diplomat and Muslim cleric.

Career 
 He was nominated City Councillor and Chairman of the Establishment Committee. Secretary-General of the Sierra Leone Muslim Congress, Teacher of English and Arabic in the Tslamia Primary School, Lecturer of Mohammedan or Muslim law and Constitution in the Extra-Mural Department of Fourah Bay College.
 Lecturer of Islamics in the Sir Milton Margai College of Education and Technology Teachers' Training College,
Organising President of the Sierra Leone Muslim Reform aition Society, 
Organising President of the Imanfya Social and Literary Association, 
Iman of the Board of Imams for the entire Muslim Community under the auspices of the Sierra Leone Muslim Congress in Freetown
In 1958 he was Mayor, Freetown City Council.
He was a founder-member of the All People's Congress.
He received his advanced Arabic/Islamic education in Saudi Arabia.
In 1973 he was named acting Imam of the Freetown Central Mosque.
From 1969 to 1975 he led the sierra Leonean mission  in Cairo.
In 1973 he was designated Ambassador.

References

1909 births
1988 deaths
Ambassadors of Sierra Leone to Egypt
People from Port Loko District